Bangalore Fort began in 1537 as a mud fort. The builder was Kempe Gowda I, a vassal  of the Vijaynagar Empire and the founder of Bangalore. Hyder Ali in 1761 replaced the mud fort with a stone fort and it was further improved by his son Tipu Sultan in the late 18th century. It was damaged during an Anglo-Mysore war in 1791. It still remains a good example of 18th-century military fortification. The army of the British East India Company, led by Lord Cornwallis on 21 March 1791 captured the fort in the siege of Bangalore during the Third Mysore War (1790–1792). At the time the fort was a stronghold for Tipu Sultan. Today, the fort's Delhi gate, on Krishnarajendra Road, and two bastions are the primary remains of the fort. A marble plaque commemorates the spot where the British breached fort's wall, leading to its capture. The old fort area also includes Tipu Sultan's Summer Palace, and his armoury. The fort has provided the setting for the treasure hunt in the book Riddle of the Seventh Stone.

History

The confirmed history of the Bangalore Fort is traced to 1537, when Kempe Gowda I (pictured), a chieftain of the Vijayanagara Empire, widely held as the founder of modern Bangalore, built a mud fort and established the area around it as Bengaluru Pete, his capital.

Kempe Gowda I, who showed remarkable qualities of leadership from childhood, had a grand vision to build a new city which was further fueled by his visits to Hampi, now a UNESCO heritage city, the then beautiful capital city of the Vijayanagar Empire. He persevered with his vision and got permission from the King Achutaraya, the ruler of the empire, to build a new city for himself. The King gifted 12 hoblis (revenue subdivisions) with an annual income of 30,000 varahas (gold coins) to Kempe Gowda to meet the expenses of his venture of building a new city.

Kempe Gowda moved from his ancestral land of Yelahanka to establish his new principality, having obtained support from King Achutaraya. It is also said that an omen of an uncommon event of a hare chasing away a hunter dog at the place favoured selection of the place and a dream of goddess Lakshmi (Hindu Goddess of wealth) that prophesied good indications of the events to happen, further sealed his decision on the place for his capital. Following this event, on an auspicious day in 1537, he conducted a ground breaking ritual and festivities by ploughing the land with four pairs of decorated white bulls in four directions, at the focal point of the junction of Doddapet and Chikkapet, the junction of the present day Avenue Road and Old Taluk Kacheri Road (OTC).

Thereafter, he constructed a mud fort (now in the western part of the city), with a moat surrounding it, and nine large gates. The building of the mud fort is also steeped in a legend. During the construction of the Fort it was said that the southern gate would collapse no sooner than it was built and human sacrifice was indicated to ward off the evil spirits. When Kempe Gowda would not accept human sacrifice, his daughter-in-law, Lakshamma, realising her father-in-Law's predicament, beheaded herself with a sword at the southern gate in the darkness of night. Thereafter, the fort was completed without any mishap. In her memory, Kempe Gowda built a temple in her name in Koramangala. Thus, Kempe Gowda's dream fructified and the Bengaluru Pete evolved around the Mud fort called the Bangalore Fort.

In 1637–38, the Bangalore Fort under Kempe Gowda's rule was very prosperous. Rustam i Zaman, the commander under the Bijapur Sultanate who was on a war campaign, and after he had captured the Sira Fort close to Bangalore, wanted to capture the Bangalore Fort and the city. However, Kasturi Ranga Nayak who had been given the Sira Fort to hold, prevailed on Rustam i Zaman not to attack the fort even though he, after capturing the town, had surrounded the fort with 30,000 strong cavalry. Kempe Gowda managed to get Nayak withdraw the troops. Randaula Khan, who was not convinced with the action of Nayak in withdrawing the troops, met Nayak in his tent and promised him more rewards and also recognition under the Bijapur rulers, Nayak relented but advised Randaula not to attack the fort at that time and that he would manage surrender of the fort by Kempe Gowda eventually. Soon enough he prevailed on Kempe Gowda to surrender the fort with all its riches without any battle. Rustom-i-Zaman then took over the fort and handed over its management to Shahji along with other territories, which he had recently conquered, with Bangalore as his headquarters.

This mud fort was enlarged during Chikkadeva Raya Wodeyar's rule between 1673 AD – 1704 AD. In 1761, it was renovated by Hyder Ali, who made it strong with stones. A part of the fort was subject to bombardment by the British when they fought a battle against Tipu Sultan, son of Hyder Ali. Tipu Sultan repaired the fort later. Inside the fort, there is temple dedicated to Lord Ganapathy.

In March 1791 the army of the British East India Company led by Lord Cornwallis laid siege to the Bangalore fort during the Third Mysore War. Following tough resistance by the Mysore army led by the Commandant Bahadur Khan, in which over 2000 people were killed, on 21 March the British breached the walls near the Delhi Gate and captured it. In the words of the British chronicler Mark Wilks "Resistance was everywhere respectable." With the capture of the Bangalore Fort the Army of British East India Company replenished supplies and obtained a strategic base from where it could attack Srirangapatna, Tippu Sultan's capital.

Fort structure 
The Bangalore fort, ca. 1791, was described as follows:

What remains of the fort today is just the Delhi Gate, and the rest has been demolished. It was originally about a km in length. Stretching from the Delhi Gate, up to the present KIMS campus. Within the Bangalore Fort were the present Victoria Hospital, the Kote Venkataramana Swamy temple, Tipu Sultan's Summer Palace, Makkala Koota park, the armoury in the Bangalore Medical College campus, Fort High School, Fort Church, Minto Ophthalmic Hospital, and the present KIMS hospital and campus.

Kote Venkataramana Temple

Fort Church

The Fort Church, Bangalore, was located within the Bangalore Fort. The church was demolished to make place for the construction of the Vani Vilas Hospital. The Government of Mysore allotted land in Chamrajpet for construction of a new church, and this is now the St. Luke's Church. Early records refer to this church as the Drummer's Chapel, constructed by British soldiers after the fall of Tipu Sultan. The Fort Church, Bangalore was the first protestant church to be raised in Bangalore.

Fort Cemetery
The Fort Cemetery, where the officers who fell in the Siege of Bangalore were buried, is illustrated in Robert Home's book, Select Views in Mysore, the country of Tipu Sultan, published by Robert Bowyer, London, 1794. Home's painting shows the graves of Captains James Smith, James Williamson, John Shipper, Nathaniel Daws and Jeremiah Delany, Lieutenant Conan and Lieutenant-Colonel Gratton. As recorded in 1895, The cemetery was located just outside the Fort Church, with the church being responsible for its maintenance. The cemetery had cypress trees, rose bushes and flowers. The Government of Mysore, had constructed a wall and gate for the cemetery.

However, as recorded in 1912 by Rev. Frank Penny in his book The Church in Madras: Volume II, the cemetery no longer existed. The record of the offers who fell in the battle for the Bangalore Fort in 1791, were transferred to the cenotaph, raised by the Government of Mysore. The cenotaph was consequently vandalised on 28 October 1964 and completely destroyed.

Fort School
The Fort Church, managed the Fort School from the end of the 19th century. The church provided furniture, study maps, and managed accounts, all overseen by the Fort Church School Committee. The Diocesan Magazine, records that on 29 December 1909, with Miss. Rozario as the head mistress (serving from 1893 to 1909), a school function being organised for the present and old students of the Fort School, by J W Hardy, Lay Trustee of the Fort Church, with prize distribution by E A Hill, School inspector and Rev. G H Lamb. In 1911, the head mistress was Miss Page, as recorded by the Diocesan Magazine.

There still exists a Fort School at Chamrajpet, with its building dating back to 1907. Once called the English Vernacular School, the Fort School is located opposite the Bangalore Medical College, and near the Tipu Sultan's Summer Palace. The School Building was built in 1907, and has amongst its students freedom fighter H S Doreswamy, cricketer G R Vishwanath, statesman V S Krishna Iyer, Mysore Maharaja Jayachamarajendra Wadiyar, former Chief Minister of Karnataka Kengal Hanumanthaiah and bureaucrat Narasimha Rao. The building is being studied by INTACH for possible renovation. The Fort School is the oldest high school in the Banglore pete area. The school at present has 186 students in English Medium and 81 studying in Kannada Medium. Majority of the English Medium students are from Tamil and Telugu families, studying all subjects in English, English language, mother tongue language and Kannada as third language.

Present status
All that remains of the fort is the Delhi Gate and remnants of two bastions. After they captured the fort in 1791, the British started dismantling it, a process that continued till the 1930s. Ramparts and walls made way for roads, while arsenals, barracks and the other old buildings quickly made way for colleges, schools, bus stands, and hospitals. In November 2012 workers at the neighbouring Bangalore Metro construction site unearthed 2 huge iron cannons weighing a ton each with cannonballs dating back to the times of Tipu Sultan.

Sketches of James Hunter

James Hunter served as a lieutenant in the Royal Artillery. He was a military painter, and his sketches portrayed aspects of military and everyday life. Hunter served the British India Army and took part in Tipu Sultan Campaigns.

Hunter has sketched different landscapes of South India, including Bangalore, Mysore, Hosur, Kancheepuram, Madras, Arcot, Sriperumbudur, etc. These paintings were published in 'A Brief history of ancient and modern India embellished with coloured engravings', published by Edward Orme, London between 1802 and 1805, and 'Picturesque scenery in the Kingdom of Mysore' published by Edward Orme in 1804.

Hunter died in India in 1792. Some of his paintings of Bangalore Fort are below

Other British Sketches of Bangalore Fort

References

Bibliography
Suras Tourist Guide To Bangalore
The African Dispersal in the Deccan: From Medieval to Modern Times
The Penny Cyclopædia of the Society for the Diffusion of Useful ..., Volume 3

External links 

There are interesting ways of knowing the history of Bangalore Fort and exploring the remnants. 

History of Bangalore
Forts in Karnataka
Buildings and structures in Bangalore
Tourist attractions in Bangalore
1537 establishments in India